Mallavaram railway station (station code:MVRM), is an Indian Railways station in Chebrolu, a village in East Godavari district of Andhra Pradesh. It lies on the Vijayawada–Chennai section and is administered under Vijayawada railway division of South Coast Railway zone.

History 
The southern part of the East Coast State Railway (from Waltair to Vijayawada) was taken over by Madras Railway in 1901.

References

External links 

Railway stations in East Godavari district
Vijayawada railway division